Robert D. Bailey Jr. (October 12, 1912 – September 29, 1994) was West Virginia Secretary of State from 1965 to 1969. He was a graduate of Concord College and Washington and Lee University School of Law.

Born in Baileysville, he was the son of Robert D. Bailey Sr. and Sue Starkey Bailey. During World War II, he served in the U.S. Army in the European Theater. Admitted to the bar in 1934, he inherited his father's law practice, including representation of railroads and timber companies in southern West Virginia, based in his home town of Pineville. His own wide-ranging business involvements included the Castle Rock Bank of Pineville, Radio Station WWYO, the Independent Herald newspaper, and the Pineville Gas Company.

A Democrat, he was Wyoming County Prosecuting Attorney from 1949 to 1961. He was appointed West Virginia Secretary of State by Governor Hulett C. Smith on May 17, 1965, and was elected in 1966, serving until January 1969.

After Smith's term ended, Bailey returned to private practice in his home town of Pineville.

He died in 1992 and was survived by his wife Jean H. Bailey, his son Robert D. Bailey III, and his three grandchildren, Angela Sue Osborn, Robert Darius Bailey IV, and Micah Alexander Bailey.

References
 West Virginia Secretaries of State (West Virginia Division of Culture and History)
 West Virginia Blue Book 1967
 Who's Who in American Politics 1967

1912 births
1994 deaths
20th-century American lawyers
20th-century American politicians
Businesspeople from West Virginia
Concord University alumni
County prosecuting attorneys in West Virginia
Military personnel from West Virginia
People from Pineville, West Virginia
Secretaries of State of West Virginia
United States Army personnel of World War II
United States Army soldiers
Washington and Lee University School of Law alumni
West Virginia Democrats
West Virginia lawyers